Jeong Ho-won (born 12 February 1986) is a Paralympic boccia player of South Korea. At the 2008 Summer Paralympics he won a bronze in individual - BC3 and shared a gold for pairs - BC3. At the 2012 Summer Paralympics in London he won a silver medal in the individual event. At the 2016 Summer Paralympics he won a gold in individual and a silver in pairs.

He has cerebral palsy as a result of falling at age one.

References 

Boccia players at the 2008 Summer Paralympics
Boccia players at the 2012 Summer Paralympics
Boccia players at the 2016 Summer Paralympics
Boccia players at the 2020 Summer Paralympics
Medalists at the 2016 Summer Paralympics
Medalists at the 2012 Summer Paralympics
Medalists at the 2008 Summer Paralympics
Paralympic medalists in boccia
Paralympic silver medalists for South Korea
Paralympic boccia players of South Korea
Paralympic gold medalists for South Korea
Paralympic bronze medalists for South Korea
Sportspeople with cerebral palsy
1986 births
Living people
People from Yeoju
Sportspeople from Gyeonggi Province